Maalia is an ethnic minority in Sudan. The population of this minority likely does not exceed 100,000. Most of them belong to Islam. 
They speak Sudanese Arabic.

References

Ethnic groups in Sudan